Fenimorea is a genus of carnivorous sea snails, marine gastropod mollusks in the family Drilliidae.

Description
(Original description) The shell is large. The whorls of the protoconch are well rounded and smooth. The whorls of the spire show strong, broad axial ribs that are retractively bent and reduced in the depressed groove below the summit and extend anteriorly to the fasciole on the base. The finer sculpture on the ribs and intercostal spaces consists of decidedly wavy incised spiral lines and fine incremental lines, which vary in strength. The combination of these two elements gives to the surface a peculiar effect, resembling the scales on some butterfly wings. This sculpture extends to the basal fasciole. The fasciole itself and the area immediately posterior to it, as well as the rest of the columella, are marked by spiral threads. The aperture is moderately long and broad and strongly channeled anteriorly. The basal sinus is deep and reflected at the edge with a strong parietal callus. The stromboid notch is shallow.

Species
Species within the genus Fenimorea include:
 Fenimorea abscondita Fallon, 2016
 Fenimorea alba Fallon, 2016
 Fenimorea biminensis Fallon, 2016
 Fenimorea caysalensis Fallon, 2016
 Fenimorea chaaci (Espinosa & Rolán, 1995)
 Fenimorea contracta Fallon, 2016
 Fenimorea crocea Fallon, 2016
 Fenimorea culexensis Nowell-Usticke, 1969
 Fenimorea elongata Fallon, 2016
 Fenimorea fabae Fallon, 2016
 Fenimorea fucata (Reeve, 1845)
 Fenimorea glennduffyi Fallon, 2016
 Fenimorea janetae Bartsch, 1934
 Fenimorea jongreenlawi Fallon, 2016
 Fenimorea kathyae Tippett, 1995
 Fenimorea mackintoshi Fallon, 2016
 Fenimorea marmarina (Watson, 1881)
 Fenimorea moseri (Dall, 1889)
 Fenimorea nivalis Fallon, 2016
 Fenimorea pagodula (Dall, 1889)
 Fenimorea petiti Tippett, 1995
 Fenimorea phasma (Schwengel, 1940)
 Fenimorea sunderlandi (Petuch, 1987)
 Fenimorea tartaneata Fallon, 2016
 Fenimorea tessellata Fallon, 2016
 Fenimorea tippetti Fallon, 2016
 Species brought into synonymy
 Fenimorea brunnescens Rehder, 1943: synonym of Bellaspira brunnescens (Rehder, 1943)
 Fenimorea halidorema Schwengel, 1940: synonym of Decoradrillia pulchella (Reeve, 1845)
 Fenimorea pentapleura J.S. Schwengel, 1940: synonym of Bellaspira pentagonalis (W.H. Dall, 1889)
 Fenimorea pulchra G.W. Nowell-Usticke, 1959 : synonym of Fenimorea fucata (Reeve, 1845)
 Fenimorea ustickei (Nowell-Usticke, 1959): synonym of Neodrillia cydia Bartsch, 1943
Nomen dubium
 Fenimorea paria (Reeve, 1846)

References

  Fallon P.J. (2016). Taxonomic review of tropical western Atlantic shallow water Drilliidae (Mollusca: Gastropoda: Conoidea) including descriptions of 100 new species. Zootaxa. 4090(1): 1-363

External links
 WMSDB - Worldwide Mollusc Species Data Base: family Drilliidae
 De Jong K.M. & Coomans H.E. (1988) Marine gastropods from Curaçao, Aruba and Bonaire. Leiden: E.J. Brill. 261 pp. 

 
Gastropod genera